Holbrook Sports Football Club is a football club based in Holbrook, near Derby, Derbyshire, England.

History
Holbrook Miners Welfare joined the Premier Division of the Central Alliance in 1973. In 1983 they were founder members of the Central Midlands League, joining the Senior Division. They were Senior Division runners-up in the league's first season, missing out on the title on goal difference. After finishing third in 1984–85 they were promoted to the Premier Division. However, the club finished bottom of the Premier Division the following season and were relegated to Division One. The 1986–87 season saw them relegated for a second successive season, this time to Division Two. However, Division Two was disbanded at the end of the 1987–88 season and the club returned to Division One. After being placed in the Premier Division North after league reorganisation in 1991, the club left the league at the end of the 1991–92 season. They returned to the league in 1994, but left again after a single season and subsequently folded at the end of the 1995–96 season.

In 1996 a new club was formed under the name Holbrook Football Club, joining the Premier Division of the Central Midlands League. After winning the Premier Division in 1999–2000 they were promoted to the Supreme Division. In 2003 the club returned to the Holbrook Miners Welfare name. In 2008 they were founder members of the East Midlands Counties League. Another renaming in 2010 saw the club become Holbrook Sports. They dropped back into the Central Midlands League South Division at the end of the 2017–18 season after resigning from the East Midlands Counties League.

Honours
Central Midlands League
Premier Division champions 1999–2000

Records
Best FA Cup performance: First qualifying round, 2009–10, 2010–11
Best FA Vase performance: Fifth round, 2010–11

References

External links

Football clubs in England
Football clubs in Derbyshire
Association football clubs established in 1996
1996 establishments in England
Amber Valley
Central Alliance
Central Midlands Football League
East Midlands Counties Football League
Mining association football teams in England